The Face Thailand Season 5 was announced on February 15, 2019, at The Market Bangkok, M floor. In season 5, as in season 4, male and female contestants competed together.

Season 5 included new Mentors Toni Rakkaen, Maria Poonlertlarp, and Virahya Pattarachokchai. The winner of The Face Thailand Season 4, Anusit Saengnimnuan, a former contestant from The Facemen Thailand Season 1, and Antoine Pinto, MC in The Facemen Thailand Season 2, served as the host of the program. The program was first broadcast on February 23, 2019.

Contestants
(ages stated are at start of filming)

Episodes

Episode 1: Casting Round 
First airdate: February 23, 2019

The host, Antoine Pinto, launched the contestants with four Mentors, including Maria Poonlertlarp, Toni Rakkaen, Virahya Pattarachokchai, and Anusit Saengnimnuan, who selected the models to be on the team. After that, the host allowed the contestants to prepare for and walk in the first round, FACE SHOT RUNWAY. The contestants had to remove all makeup for the runway. Mentors had to vote on each contestant. If a contestant was approved by two out of three Mentors, the contestant was allowed to advance further.

Episode 2: Acting Skill and Team Selection Round
First airdate: March 9, 2019
 Featured photographer: Punsiri Siriwetchapun

Episode 3: Tresemmé Fashion Show
First airdate: March 16, 2019

 Winning coach and team:  Toni Rakkaen
 Bottom four: Bill Sida, Emmy Sawyer, Liam Samuels & Montra Tantawan
 Eliminated: Bill Sida, Emmy Sawyer, Liam Samuels & Montra Tantawan (All four eliminated)

Episode 4: Join The Squad
First airdate: March 23, 2019

 Winning coach and team:  Maria Poonlertlarp
 Bottom two: Top Tunjaroen & Mimi Kanyarat 
 Eliminated: Mimi Kanyarat
 Featured Director: Vatanyu Ingkavivat

Episode 5: Love and Humanity
First airdate: March 30, 2019

 Winning coach and team:  Gina Virayah and Bank Anusith
 Bottom two: Top Tunjaroen & Posie Samuels 
 Eliminated: Posie Samuels 
 Featured Photographer: Athiwat Toothongkham

Episode 6: This is New Belief
First airdate: April 6, 2019

 Winning coach and team:  Gina Virayah and Bank Anusith
 Bottom three: Top Tunjaroen, Tan Khamwachirapitak & Greg de Bodt
 Eliminated: Tan Khamwachirapitak
 Special Mentor: Peach Pachara

Episode 7: Fashion video skincare products
First airdate: April 13, 2019

 Winning coach and team:   Maria Poonlertlarp
 Bottom four: Chompooh, Marcos, Matthew & Top
 Eliminated: Chompooh, Marcos, Matthew & Top (all four eliminated)

Episode 8: Fashion video mobile phone
First airdate: April 20, 2019

 Winning coach and team:  Gina Virayah and Bank Anusith
 Bottom three:Candy, Eve & Dream
 Eliminated: Dream
 Return: Chompooh, Montra, Marcos

Episode 9: Fashion Video eyecare product
First airdate: April 27, 2019

 Winning coach and team:  Gina Virayah and Bank Anusith
 Bottom two: Candy Tansiri & Sia Okoye
 Eliminated: Sia Okoye

Episode 10:Music video
Firisr airdate:May 4, 2019

 Winning coach and team: Toni Rakkaen 
 Bottom two: Greg & Marcos
 Eliminated: No eliminated

Episode 11:Fashion video haircare product
First airdate:May 11, 2019
Winning coach and team:  Gina Virayah and Bank Anusith
 Bottom two: Eve & Marcos
 Eliminated: Marcos

Episode 12:Catwalk show
First airdate:May 18, 2019

Winning coach and team:  Gina Virayah and Bank Anusith
 Winning Challenge: Chompooh
 Top 3 selected: Montra, Zorzo, Candy
 Eliminated: Greg, Minnie & Eve

Episode 13: Final walk
First airdate:May 25, 2019

Winning coach and team: Maria Poonlertlarp
Winner: Candy
Runner-up: Zorzo, Chompooh
Eliminated: Montra

Summaries

Elimination Table

 The contestant was part of the winning team for the episode.
 The contestant was part of the winning team for the episode with other contestants.
 The contestant was at risk of elimination.
 The contestant was immune from elimination.
 The contestant was at risk of elimination due to having the worst performance in the master class but was part of the winning team for the episode.  
 The contestant was at risk of elimination due to having the worst performance in the master class and was eliminated from the competition.
 The contestant was eliminated from the competition.
 The contestant was originally eliminated but was returned to the competition on their original team by the master Mentor of the winning team for the episode.
 The contestant was originally eliminated but was returned to the competition and switched to a new team by the mastor Mentor of the winning team for the episode.
 The contestant was originally eliminated but invited back as a guest in a campaign.
 The contestant was a Runner-Up.
 The contestant won The Face Thailand.

 Episodes 1 and 2 were the casting episodes. The final eighteen contestants were divided into teams of six as they were selected.
 In episodes 3, team Toni won the campaign. Maria nominated Bill, Sabina nominated Emmy, Gina and Bank nominated Liam while Art nominated Montra for elimination. Toni and Moo eliminated all of them.
 In episodes 6–9 The contestant was having the worst performance in the challenge was at risk of elimination despite being on the winning team.
 In episodes 7–9 The contestant was having the best performance in the challenge was immune from elimination.
 In episode 7, team Maria won the campaign. Marcos and Matthew automatically advancing into the elimination, Toni and Moo nominated Top while Gina Bank and Art nominated Chompoo for elimination. Maria eliminated all of them.
 In episode 8, team Gina and Bank won the campaign. After Dream was eliminated, Art Chose Montra Marcos and Chompoo returned to the competition. Art nominated Montra returned to Team Toni and nominated Marcos returned to Team Maria while Chompoo returned to her original team.
 In episode 10, team Toni won the campaign. Maria and Sabina nominated Marcos while Gina Bank and Art nominated Greg for the elimination. Toni didn't eliminate both of them.
 In episode 12, Chompoo won the campaign individually, automatically advancing into the finale. Toni Miria Gina and Bank were allowed to choose any one contestant to advance into the finale from the remaining Seven models. Candy automatically advancing into the finale. Toni chose Montra. Gina and Bank chose Zorzo. Eve Minnie and Greg were eliminated.
 In episode 13, Zorzo won the campaign individually, Zorzo, Chompoo and Candy were put through to the final runway show while Montra was eliminated. Toni was having no models left to compete.

Campaigns
 Episode 1: Runway (Casting)
 Episode 2: Acting and Self Administered 'Transformations' (Casting)
 Episode 3: Hair Fashion Show with Vertical Runway( TREseme)
 Episode 4: Slow Motion Fashion Video (TONEBOX)
 Episode 5: Pre-wedding photoshoot
 Episode 6: Fashion Video with Car (CHR)
 Episode 7: Fashion Video with Skincare products(LAMP)
 Episode 8: Fashion Video with Mobile Phone( HUAWEI)
 Episode 9: Fashion Video with Eyecare product(VISION)
 Episode 10: Music video with Comfort
 Episode 11: Fashion video with haircare products( TREseme)
 Episode 12: Catwalk show 
 Episode 13: Acting and Final walk.

References

Thailand, 5
The Face Thailand seasons
2019 Thai television seasons